Hibernia 41-E and 42-E were steam locomotives of Hibernia AG. Locomotive No 42-E was scrapped, but No 41-E does still exist and was temporarily displayed in front of the Starlight Express Theater in Bochum.

History 

The coal mining company Hibernia AG bought 1942 during World War II two five-coupled and one four-coupled locomotives  from Henschel & Son in Kassel for use around the mine. The locomotives were used above ground on the rail network of the former Bergwerks-AG Recklinghausen which was later called Bergbau AG Herne/Recklinghausen until 1970 and 1971, respectively. Hibernia 41-E was finally used in the coal mine Bergwerk General Blumenthal in Recklinghausen and then sold to Bochum Dahlhausen Railway Museum.

At the premiere of the musical Starlight Express in 1988 in Bochum, the locomotive was displayed for a short time as an eye catcher in front of the new built theatre but then returned to the museum. For the 5000th show the locomotive was again lent to the Starlight Express Theatre to stay there with an old coach for three years. However, the locomotive has not been transported back and is still displayed in front of the theater.

Technology 

It is a standard gauge superheated steam tank locomotive with 5 coupled axles, which is similar to the Henschel-Type E800 but with some notable exceptions. Therefore, it is called Henschel-Type Bochum. During World War II the firebox could not be made from copper, and steel was used instead. In 1956 it was modified by installing roller bearings and a mixing pre-heater by Henschel. The steam operated brake was replaced by a pneumatic brake with compressed air.

References 

 
 
 

Bochum
Coal mining
0-10-0T locomotives
Henschel locomotives
Standard gauge locomotives of Germany
Railway locomotives introduced in 1942